Raoul Auernheimer (April 15, 1876 in Vienna – January 6, 1948, in Oakland, California) was an Austrian jurist and writer.

Personal life 
Auernheimer was the son of German businessman Johann Wilhelm Auernheimer and his Hungarian-Jewish wife Charlotte "Jenny" Büchler. At age 30, he married Irene Leopoldine Guttmann of Budapest.

Education 
After receiving his Abitur, Auernheimer began to study law at the university in his hometown. He concluded his studied with a doctorate in 1900 and became a court assessor in a Viennese court.

Career 
Through his uncle Theodor Herzl he gained employment at the Neue Freie Presse. He wrote articles about the theater until 1933. In addition to his own name, he also used the pseudonyms Raoul Heimern and Raoul Othmar. 

In 1923, he became a manager of the Austrian PEN association. He was president until 1927 and remained vice-president. In March 1938, he was arrested and interned in the Dachau concentration camp. Because of a request by writer Emil Ludwig, the general counsel of the United States Raymund Geist intervened against his arrest. At the end of 1938 he was released and emigrated to New York City.

Works 
 Aus unserer verlorenen Zeit. Vienna: Molden, 2004. 
 Franz Grillparzer: Der Dichter Österreichs. Vienna: Amalthea-Verl., 1972
 Josef-Kainz-Gedenkbuch. Vienna: Frisch, 1924
 Metternich: Staatsmann und Kavalier. Munich: Heyne, 1978. 
 Die rechte und die linke Hand. Graz: Styria Verl., 1999. 
 Das Wirtshaus zur verlorenen Zeit. Vienna: Ullstein, 1948

1876 births
1948 deaths
Austrian emigrants to the United States
Austrian male writers
Austro-Hungarian journalists
American people of Austrian-Jewish descent
American people of German descent
American people of Hungarian-Jewish descent
Austrian people of German descent
Austrian people of Hungarian-Jewish descent
Dachau concentration camp survivors
Jewish Austrian writers
People from Oakland, California
People from Vienna